The Vodacom Challenge 2007 was played between 21 July and 28 July 2007. The teams involved were:

  Orlando Pirates
  Kaizer Chiefs
  Tottenham Hotspur

First round

Third place match

Final

2007
2007–08 in English football
2007–08 in South African soccer